Jeff Cesario (born March 30, 1953) is an actor, comedian, producer and writer who has written and produced for Dennis Miller Live and The Larry Sanders Show. He has appeared on Adam Carolla, The Larry Sanders Show, The Tonight Show Starring Johnny Carson and Comedy Central Presents, among other shows.

Cesario was a part of two Emmy wins with Dennis Miller Live.

References

https://web.archive.org/web/20050312010613/http://www.comediansusa.com/standup/jeff-cesario.html
http://www.comedycentral.com/comedians/browse/c/jeff_cesario.jhtml?display=bio

External links
 official website
 Sportalicious!, his sports satire website

1953 births
Living people
American male comedians
21st-century American comedians
American comedy writers